The Patriotic Movement for Renewal is a political party in Mali.

The MPR candidate in the presidential election held on 28 April 2002 was Choguel Kokalla Maïga, who won 2.7% of the vote.

In the parliamentary election held on 14 July 2002, the MPR won 5 out of 160 seats as a part of the Hope 2002 coalition. In the 1 July and 22 July 2007 parliamentary election, the party won 8 out of 160 seats.

Political parties in Mali